is a Japanese actress, voice actress and singer.  She played Nunnally Lamperouge in Code Geass: Lelouch of the Rebellion, the eponymous character in Eureka Seven and Cosette in Les Misérables: Shōjo Cosette. She announced her marriage in February 2011 and had a daughter on January 1, 2012.

Filmography

Television

Film

Live-action films

Drama CD

Video games

Dubbing
 Burying the Ex, Evelyn (Ashley Greene)
 Dragon Tiger Gate, Ma Xiaoling (Dong Jie)
 Paranormal Activity 2, Ali Rey (Molly Ephraim)
 X Company, Aurora Luft (Evelyne Brochu)

References

 Nakagami, Yoshikatsu et al. "Voice Actress Spotlight". (March 2007) Newtype USA. pp. 112–113.

External links
  
 
 

1985 births
Living people
Japanese child actresses
Japanese women pop singers
Japanese musical theatre actresses
Japanese stage actresses
Japanese video game actresses
Japanese voice actresses
Voice actresses from Tokyo
20th-century Japanese actresses
21st-century Japanese actresses
21st-century Japanese singers
21st-century Japanese women singers